Garrison Ground is a multi purpose stadium in Shillong, Meghalaya. The ground is mainly used for organizing matches of football, cricket and other sports. It hosts the home matches of Shillong Lajong FC of the I-League.

The stadium has hosted single Ranji Trophy matches  from 1964 when Assam cricket team played against United Provinces cricket team until 1989 but since then the stadium has hosted non-first-class matches.

References

External links 
 Cricketarchive
 Cricinfo
 Wikimapia

Football venues in Meghalaya
Shillong
Sports venues in Meghalaya
Shillong Lajong FC
Cricket grounds in Meghalaya
Sport in Jaipur
Defunct cricket grounds in India
Sports venues completed in 1948
1948 establishments in India
20th-century architecture in India